Malalai of Maiwand , also known as Malala, or Malalai Anna (meaning Malalai the "Grandmother") is a national folk hero of Afghanistan who rallied Pashtun fighters during the Battle of Maiwand. She fought alongside Ayub Khan and was responsible for the Afghan victory at the Battle of Maiwand on 27 July 1880, during the Second Anglo-Afghan War. She is also known as "The Afghan Jeanne d'Arc" or as "The Afghan Molly Pitcher" to the Western world. There are many schools, hospitals, and other institutions named after her in Afghanistan. Her story is told in the Afghan school text books.

Biography
Malalai was born in 1861 in the village of Khig, about 3 miles southwest of Maiwand in the southern Kandahar province of Afghanistan. During the late 1880s, war broke out between Afghanistan and Great Britain, with the last war between the two states being in the 1840s. The British, along with their Indian forces, had launched a major expedition into Afghanistan from India. The main garrison of the British was located in Kandahar, which is the closest city to the town of Maiwand. The military of Afghanistan was represented by commander Ayub Khan, son of Afghan Emir Sher Ali Khan. Malalai's father, who was a shepherd, and her fiancé joined with Ayub Khan's army in the large attack on the British-Indian forces in July 1880. Like many Afghan women, Malalai was there to help tend to the wounded or provide water and spare weapons. According to local sources, this was also supposed to be her wedding day.

When the Afghan army was losing morale, despite their superior numbers, Malalai took the Afghan flag and shouted:Young love! If you do not fall in the battle of Maiwand,
By God, someone is saving you as a symbol of shame!

This inspired the Afghan fighters to redouble their efforts. When a lead flag-bearer was killed, Malalai went forward and held up the flag (some versions say she used her veil as a flag), singing a landai (a short folk-song sung by Afghan women):
With a drop of my sweetheart's blood,
Shed in defense of the Motherland,
Will I put a beauty spot on my forehead,
Such as would put to shame the rose in the garden!

Malalai was herself struck down and killed by a British soldier. However, her words had spurred on her countrymen to victory. After the battle, Malalai was honored for her efforts and buried in her native village of Khig, where her grave remains today. She was 18 or 19 at the time of her death. She is buried in the village of Karez along with her father and fiancé, locals regard her grave as a shrine.

The Pashtun poet Ajmal Khattak wrote the following lines about Malalai: 
My Malalai is living, and they praise others' beauty.
Though they have eyes, they are blind.

Legacy

Malalai made an appearance in an animated opening scene of the documentary, He Named Me Malala.

Pakistan activist Malala Yousafzai was named in honor of Malalai when she was born on July 12, 1997.

Malala Maiwand, an Afghan journalist was also named to avoid the identity confusion with the Afghan Joan of Arc until her murder on December 10th, 2020.

Reception 
The authenticity of the story and of Malalai has been questioned by many scholars. Even though she has become well received by the Afghan state and many believe it to be genuine, it seems to be more of a folklore than historical reality. No British historian of that time referred to or mentioned Malalai's name, even the local records are missing. The British author Howard Hensmen, in his book The Afghan War, does mention that one woman was found amongst the dead in Ahmad khel, but the battle of Ahmad khail occurred on 19 April 1880, while the battle of Maiwand was on 27 July 1880.

Afghan historian Muhammad Siddiq Farhand wrote a three volume book "Afghanistan in the past five centuries" a very distinguished piece in afghan history, he also failed to mention such a character as Malalai.

The first time Malalai's name was mentioned was 40–60 years after the battle of Maiwand. Many believe it was Abdul Hai Habibi who coined the story during the period of Pashto Tolana to support the national narrative and Pashtun nationalism. Habibi has previously been accused of forgery, in the case of Pata Khazana.

See also
Nazo Tokhi, a 17th-century Afghan warrior
Malala Yousafzai, the youngest and the first Pashtun Nobel Prize laureate, who was named after Malalai of Maiwand

References

External links
Afghan heroine Malalai
Malalai of Maiwand
Afghan Women's History

Afghan activists
1861 births
1880 deaths
Women in war in South Asia
Women in 19th-century warfare
Pashtun women
19th-century Afghan people

hi:मलाला मैवंद